Georgia competed at the 2018 Winter Olympics in Pyeongchang, South Korea, from 9 to 28 February 2018, with a total of four athletes in three sports.

Competitors
The following is the list of number of competitors participating at the Games per sport/discipline.

Alpine skiing 

Georgia qualified two athletes, one male and one female.

Figure skating 

Georgia has qualified one male figure skater, based on its placement at the 2017 World Figure Skating Championships in Helsinki, Finland.

Luge 

Based on the results from the World Cups during the 2017–18 Luge World Cup season, Georgia qualified 1 sled.

References

Nations at the 2018 Winter Olympics
2018
Winter Olympics